Akouré is a village in south-eastern Ivory Coast. It is in the sub-prefecture of Oghlwapo, Alépé Department, La Mé Region, Lagunes District.

Akouré was a commune until March 2012, when it became one of 1126 communes nationwide that were abolished.

Notes

Former communes of Ivory Coast
Populated places in Lagunes District
Populated places in La Mé